Hugh Francis Tollemache (19 September 1802 – 2 March 1890) was an English priest of the Church of England.

Tollemache was born in Petersham, Surrey, the son of William Tollemache, Lord Huntingtower and Catherine Rebecca Grey. He was educated at Harrow School and Trinity College, Cambridge. He became rector of the Parish of Harrington in Northamptonshire from 1831 until his death in 1890, when he was succeeded by a priest named Atkins.

He married Matilda Hume (daughter of Joseph Hume of Notting Hill) on 22 June 1824.  They had 10 children:
Matilda Anne Frances Tollemache (born 13 March 1825, married 30 March 1869)
 Ralph William Lyonel Tollemache (priest; 19 October 1826 – 5 October 1895)
An unnamed child (31 December 1827 - 1 January 1828)
Louisa Harrington Tollemache (3 February 1833, married 13 November 1862)
 Clement Reginald Tollemache (priest; born 11 March 1835, married 19 January 1869)
Cornelia Katherine Tollemache (born 12 September 1836)
 Ernest Celestine Tollemache (priest; born 7 January 1838, married 8 November 1870)
 Augustus Francis Tollemache (priest; born 6 September 1839)
Cecilia Eleanor Tollemache (born 19 December 1840)
Anastasius Eugene Tollemache (22 July 1842 - 16 March 1912)

References

External links
Descendants of Sir Robert de Manners, of Etal 
thePeerage.com

1802 births
1890 deaths
People educated at Harrow School
Alumni of Trinity College, Cambridge
19th-century English Anglican priests
Younger sons of baronets
Younger sons of barons
Hugh Francis Tollemache
People from North Northamptonshire
Petersham, London
People from the London Borough of Richmond upon Thames